Herzegovina uprising or Herzegovinian uprising may refer to:

 Herzegovina uprising (1596–97), fought by Serbs in Herzegovina against the Ottoman Empire, 1596–1597
 Herzegovina uprising (1852–62), fought by Serbs in Herzegovina against the Ottoman Empire, 1852–1862
 Herzegovina uprising (1875–77), fought by Serbs in Herzegovina against the Ottoman Empire, 1875–1877
 June 1941 uprising in eastern Herzegovina, fought by Serbs in eastern Herzegovina against Ustaše in 1941

See also 
 Herzegovina (disambiguation)
 Herzegovinian (disambiguation)
 Uprising in Bosnia and Herzegovina (disambiguation)
 Serbian Uprising (disambiguation)

Herzegovina